Valnontey   is a small village of Cogne  in Aosta Valley, the smallest region of Italy. It is completely within the Gran Paradiso National Park.

Frazioni of Aosta Valley
Valleys of Aosta Valley